Isoceras saxicola is a moth in the family Cossidae. It was described by Hugo Theodor Christoph in 1885. It is found in Azerbaijan and Iran.

References

Cossinae
Moths described in 1885
Moths of Asia
Moths of Europe